The Elaphomycetaceae are a family of fungi in the order Eurotiales. According to a 2008 estimate, the family contains two genera and 27 species.

References

External links
 
 

Eurotiales
Ascomycota families
Taxa described in 1889